Gaggo , also called Gaggo Mandi, is a city situated on the Multan road between Burewala and Arifwala, in Vehari District, Punjab, Pakistan.  It is the subdivision of Burewala. According to census of 2017, its population is 126,468.

References

Populated places in Vehari District